The 2016 FIBA Women's European Championship for Small Countries was the 14th edition of this tournament. It took place in Gibraltar from 28 June to 3 July 2016.

Malta won their third title in this event by beating Ireland in the final, 67–59.

Teams
Six countries will join the tournament:

Draw
The draw took place on 22 January 2016.

Preliminary round
All times are CEST (UTC+2)

Group A

Group B

Final round

Quarterfinals

Semifinals

Fifth place game

Third place game

Final

Final ranking

References

External links 
 The Championship at FIBA.com

FIBA Women's European Championship for Small Countries
Small Countries
International sports competitions hosted by Gibraltar
Basketball in Gibraltar
2016 in Gibraltarian sport
FIBA Women's European Championship for Small Countries
FIBA Women's European Championship for Small Countries